Demitrius Irving Tolentino Omphroy (born May 30, 1989) is a painter with a contemporary expressionistic style and a former footballer who played as a defender and a midfielder. Born and raised in the United States, which he represented at under-17 level, he is also a citizen of Panama and the Philippines through descent. He played for the former at under–21 level and for the latter at senior level. He also appeared in the Major League Soccer.

Career

College and Amateur
Omphroy played with Sporting Clube de Portugal Academy Juniores at age 17. He returned to the U.S. and played four years of college soccer for the University of California, Berkeley. During his college career, he also played for the San Francisco Seals in the USL Premier Development League, and for National Premier Soccer League club Bay Area Ambassadors.

Professional
Omphroy was selected by Toronto FC in the second round (26th overall) of the 2011 MLS SuperDraft. He was officially signed by Toronto FC on March 16, 2011. Omphroy made his debut for Toronto June 29 as a second half sub for Joao Plata in a 1–0 home victory over Vancouver Whitecaps FC. Originally a right back, Omphroy was moved to the forward position after a few games with Toronto FC.

Omphroy was waived by Toronto on November 23, 2011.

In September 2012, he signed up for Filipino side Global FC for the 2012–2013 season. His first appearance in the club was on October 20, 2012, coming off the bench against Philippine Navy where the won, 4–0 in the group stage of 2012 UFL Cup. He then scored against Kaya in the 33rd minute to help the club secure a win in 2–1 scoreline and advance to the semi-finals.

International
Omphroy represented the United States at under-18 level. In June 2010 Omphroy was selected by Julio Dely Valdés to play for the Panama under-21 national team in qualifiers for the Central American Games.

In August 2012 he was called up to the Philippines, and was featured in a friendly match with USL PDL club Chicago Inferno which ended in a 1–3 loss. He made his first official appearance coming off the bench in a 1–0 win to Guam at the 2012 Philippine Peace Cup.

Personal
Omphroy's parents were born in the United States, like him. His father was the son of a Panamanian man and a German woman; his mother, the daughter of a Filipino couple.

He has multiple sclerosis, which was first discovered having as a result of a magnetic resonance imaging (MRI) scan in February 2010. He had initially experienced vision problems and numbness in his foot while with Sporting Clube de Portugal Academy Juniores. The symptoms, which later included neck pain, precluded him from signing his first professional contract with Sporting and forced him to return to the United States for medical attention. Toronto FC had no knowledge of his condition when they drafted him. Part of Omphroy's ongoing treatment is daily self-injections of Copaxone.

Omphroy appeared in the music video for the song "Boyfriend" by Canadian pop singer Justin Bieber.

References

External links
 
 Golden Bears profile
 

1989 births
Living people
American people of German descent
American soccer players
American sportspeople of Filipino descent
American sportspeople of Panamanian descent
Association football fullbacks
California Golden Bears men's soccer players
Expatriate footballers in Portugal
Expatriate soccer players in Canada
Filipino expatriate footballers
Filipino footballers
Filipino people of German descent
Filipino people of Panamanian descent
Global Makati F.C. players
Major League Soccer players
Panamanian footballers
Panamanian people of Filipino descent
Panamanian people of German descent
Citizens of the Philippines through descent
People with acquired Panamanian citizenship
People with multiple sclerosis
Philippines international footballers
USL League Two players
San Francisco Seals (soccer) players
Soccer players from California
Sportspeople from Alameda, California
Toronto FC draft picks
Toronto FC players
United States men's youth international soccer players